Melody Road is Neil Diamond's 32nd studio album, and first album of original music recorded since 2008's well-received Home Before Dark, which debuted on the US album charts at #1. It was produced by Don Was and Jacknife Lee.

After 40 years recording solo for Columbia (Capitol had released Diamond's 1980 soundtrack album for The Jazz Singer.), Diamond signed with Capitol Records in early 2014. At the same time, his back catalogue was moved to Universal Music Group, Capitol's parent company. 

On September 8, 2014, six of the tracks from Melody Road were premiered at the Capitol Records studios in Hollywood, CA at a listening party for a small group of music industry executives and journalists.  Following the event, Billboard wrote that the album is "rich in orchestration that retains the dark rustic qualities of his last two studio albums of original material, 12 Songs and Home Before Dark. Of the songs, the article stated that "'Something Blue', the most commercial of the songs played Monday, has the classic Diamond mid-tempo lilt; the ballads 'The Art of Love' and '(Ooo) Do I Wanna Be Yours' offer springboards for Diamond's still-potent voice; and 'Seongah and Jimmy' is an eyewitness account of a romance between a woman from Korea and a man from Long Island."  The Wall Street Journal wrote that "The Art of Love"  is a "tender offering from Diamond, who at age 73, hasn't lost that ability to convey a wide swath of emotions in just four minutes."

In September, three videos from the album were released. A lyric video for "The Art of Love" debuted on Diamond's YouTube/VEVO channel, and the video for the album's first single, "Something Blue", premiered on Yahoo! Music. Rolling Stone debuted the video for "Nothing But a Heartache".

Reception

The album received generally favorable reviews.  Ann Powers of NPR wrote: "This is music with (as one song title says) a sunny disposition, expressing Diamond's resilient faith in the power of both romance and the balladry that enhances it. 'Still remember the first word you wrote, in every single note that you play,' he declares in "First Time," a joyful remembrance of musical beginnings that recalls one of the singer's own early hits, "I'm a Believer." Diamond's ability to do that, to be in the moment while knowing just what makes his long career special, keeps him vital. Few could navigate this road with so much panache."

In October 2014, Melody Road debuted at number 3 on the Billboard charts, selling 78,000 copies in the first week.  The album has sold 235,000 copies in the United States as of September 2016.

Track listing

Personnel 
 Neil Diamond – vocals, guitars
 Jim Cox – keyboards 
 Rami Jaffee – keyboards
 Greg Phillinganes – keyboards
 Matt Rollings – keyboards
 Benmont Tench – keyboards
 C.J. Vanston – keyboards
 Don Was – keyboards
 Jacknife Lee – keyboards, guitars
 Richard Bennett – guitars
 Mark Goldenberg – guitars
 Hadley Hockensmith – guitars
 Smokey Hormel – guitars
 Greg Leisz – guitars
 Blake Mills – guitars
 Tim Pierce – guitars
 James "Hutch" Hutchinson – bass
 Sebastian Steinberg – bass
 Jeremy Stacey – drums
 Joey Waronker – drums, percussion
 Alan Estes – percussion
 Sara Andon – flute
 Don Markese – flute
 Davide Rossi – strings (11), string arrangements (11)
 Julia Waters – backing vocals 
 Maxine Waters – backing vocals
 Oren Waters – backing vocals

Horns (Tracks 3, 4 & 10)
 Eric Gorfain – arrangements
 Mark Bolin
 Mike Cottone
 John Fumo
 Justin Hageman
 Stephanie O'Keefe
 Dan Weinstein
 Jamelle Williams
 
Strings (Tracks 3 & 5)
 Alan Lindgren – arrangements and conductor)
 Assa Drori – concertmaster
 Erik Avinder (3)
 Robert Berg (3, 5)
 Chuck Berghofer (3, 5)
 Sally Berman (3, 5)
 Caroline Buckman (3, 5)
 Phillippa Ruth Clarke-Ling (5)
 Giovanna Clayton (3, 5)
 Matthew Cooker (3)
 Marcia Dickstein (5)
 Andrew Duckles (3, 5)
 Alan Estes (5)
 Michael Ferril (3, 5)
 Alex Gorlovsky (3, 5)
 Agnes Gottschewski (5)
 Lynn Grants (3, 5)
 Maurice Grants (3, 5)
 Sarkis Gyurgchyan (5)
 Vahe Hayrikian (5)
 Norman Hughes (3, 5)
 Carrie Kennedy (5)
 Ovsep Ketendjian (3, 5)
 Anna Kostyucheck (3)
 Johana Krejci (3)
 Gayle Levant (3)
 Marina Manukian (3)
 Dennis Molchan (3, 5)
 Karolina Naziemiec (3, 5)
 Cheryl Norman (5)
 Aaron Oltman (5)
 Joel Pargman (3, 5)
 Steve Richards (3, 5)
 Anatoly Rosinsky (3)
 Jody Rubin (3, 5)
 Harry Shirinian (3)
 Christina Soule (3, 5)
 David Stone (3, 5)
 Kevan Torfeh (3, 5)
 Elizabeth Wilson (3, 5)
 Zhou Yi (3, 5)
 Shari Zippert (3, 5)

Production 
 Producers – Jacknife Lee and Don Was 
 Recorded by Tom McFall
 Recording Assistants – Matt Bishop, Pablo Hernandez and Kyle Stevens.
 Strings and Vocals recorded by Bernie Becker 
 Mixed by Bob Clearmountain at Mix This! (Los Angeles, California), assisted by Sergio Rueles.
 Mastered by Bernie Becker at Bernie Becker Mastering (Pasadena, California), assisted by Dale Becker.
 Art Direction – Todd Gallopo
 Design – Todd Gallopo and Leslie Kim
 Studio Photography – Jesse Diamond and Todd Gallopo
 Cover Portrait Photo – Micah Diamond
 Cover, Background and Package Photos – Al Michaelson
 Liner Notes – Julie Farman

Charts

Weekly charts

Year-end charts

Certifications

References

External links 
"The Art of Love" lyric video  
Official website 

Neil Diamond albums
Albums produced by Don Was
Capitol Records albums
2014 albums